Sadie Farrell (fl. 1869) was an alleged semi-folklorish American criminal, gang leader and river pirate known under the pseudonym Sadie the Goat.

Criminal career
She is believed to have been a vicious street mugger in New York's "Bloody" Fourth Ward. Upon encountering a lone traveler, she would headbutt like a charging goat a man in the stomach, and her male accomplice would hit the victim with a slungshot and then rob him. Sadie, according to popular underworld lore, was engaged in a long-time feud with a tough, six-feet-tall female bouncer known as Gallus Mag, who finally bit off Sadie's ear in a bar fight, as Mag was known to do, albeit usually with male trouble-makers.

Folklore has it that, leaving the area in disgrace, she ventured to the waterfront area in West Side Manhattan. It was while wandering the dockyards in the spring of 1869 that she witnessed members of the Charlton Street Gang unsuccessfully attempting to board a small sloop anchored in mid-river. Watching the men being driven back across the river by a handful of the ship's crew, she offered her services to the men and became the gang's leader. Within days, she engineered the successful hijacking of a larger sloop  and, with "the Jolly Roger flying from the masthead", she and her crew reputedly sailed up and down the Hudson and Harlem Rivers raiding small villages, robbing farm houses and riverside mansions, and occasionally kidnapping men, women, and children for ransom. She was said to have made several male prisoners "walk the plank".

She and her men continued their activities for several months and stashed their cargo in several hiding spots until they could be gradually disposed of through fences and pawn shops along the Hudson and East Rivers. By the end of the summer, the farmers had begun resisting the raids, attacking landing parties with gunfire. The group abandoned the sloop and Sadie returned to the Fourth Ward, where she was now known as the "Queen of the Waterfront". She then claimed to have made a truce with Gallus Mag, who returned Sadie's ear. Mag had displayed it in a pickled jar in the bar. Sadie kept the ear in a locket and wore it around her neck for the rest of her life.

See also
Charlton Street Gang
Daybreak Boys
Gallus Mag
George Gastlin (Steamboat Squad)
Hell-Cat Maggie
Hook Gang
Patsy Conroy
Patsy Conroy Gang
River pirate

References

Further reading
Lorimer, Sara. Booty: Girl Pirates on the High Seas. San Francisco: Chronicle Books, 2001; 
Sifakis, Carl. The Dictionary of Historic Nicknames: A Treasury of More Than 7,500 Famous and Infamous Nicknames from World History. New York: Facts on File Publications, 1984; 

19th-century American criminals
American female organized crime figures
American pirates
American robbers
American female pirates
American gangsters of Irish descent
Gang members of New York City
People whose existence is disputed
Place of birth missing
Place of death missing
Year of birth missing
Year of death missing
19th-century pirates